KOMPSAT-3 (Korean Multi-purpose Satellite-3), also known as Arirang-3, is a South Korean multipurpose Earth observation satellite. It was launched from Tanegashima Space Center, Japan at 16:39 UTC on 17 May 2012. Like the earlier KOMPSAT-1 and KOMPSAT-2 satellites, it takes its name from the popular Korean folk song Arirang. Its launch was the culmination of a project begun in 1995.

It weighs . The satellite carries an Advanced Earth Imaging Sensor System (AEISS), which can distinguish to a 70-cm resolution, allowing the identification of individual vehicles on the ground.

The satellite was succeeded by KOMPSAT-5 and KOMPSAT-3A, which were launched on 2013 and 2015 respectively.

History 
South Korea started the KOMPSAT programme in 1995 to nurture its national Earth-imaging industry and supply services for remote-sensing applications. The South Korean KOMPSAT-3 Earth-imaging satellite was developed by Korea Aerospace Research Institute (KARI), in partnership with EADS Astrium, to assure continuity with the KOMPSAT-2 satellite launched in 2006. KOMPSAT-3 was orbited on 17 May 2012 by a launch vehicle from Tanegashima Space Center, Japan. SI Imaging Services is the worldwide exclusive distributor of KOMPSAT imagery since November 2012.

Technologies

Orbit 
KOMPSAT-3 operates in a near-polar, circular Sun-synchronous orbit. The orbital parameters are:
 Mean altitude: 685.1 km
 Mass: 980 kg
 Inclination: 98.13° (Sun-synchronous orbit)
 Orbital period: 98.5 minutes
 Orbital cycle: 28 days

Instruments 
KOMPSAT-3's instruments are designed to acquire high- and very-high-resolution imagery with a footprint of 16.8 km. The satellite has the capacity to acquire 20 minutes of imagery on each orbit and it can steer its sensors both ways out to 30° off track. Panchromatic and multispectral images can be acquired at the same time.

KOMPSAT-3 radiometer features:

Ground receiving stations 
Two receiving stations deliver KOMPSAT-3 imagery 1 to 3 days after acquisition. The Deajeon station in South Korea is responsible for tasking the satellite.

Advantages and applications of KOMPSAT-3 imagery 
KOMPSAT-3 is designed for very-high-resolution (VHR) remote-sensing applications, such as:
 Land planning: to detect and identify features smaller than 1 square meter, e.g. vehicles, street furnishings, roads and bushes
 Agriculture: to pinpoint crop or tree diseases
 Urban planning and demographics: to locate detached houses
 Civil engineering: to plan road, railroad and oil pipeline corridors
 Defence: to describe high-value assets or military sites

South Korea 
It serves along with the existing Kompsat-2 to provide continuous satellite observation of the Korean Peninsula, sending images twice a day at 01:30 and 13:30.

See also 

 STSAT-2
 GIS
 Remote sensing
 Korean Aerospace Research Institute

References

External links 
 Reuters report
 KARI
 SI Imaging Services
 Satrec Initiative
 Spot Image

Satellites orbiting Earth
Satellites of South Korea
Spacecraft launched in 2012